The 2008 Swedish Golf Tour, titled as the 2008 SAS Masters Tour for sponsorship reasons, was the 25th season of the Swedish Golf Tour.

Most tournaments also featured on the 2008 Nordic Golf League.

Scandinavian Airline System (SAS) took over as main sponsor of the tour after 12 years with Telia Company, and the name was changed to the SAS Masters Tour.

Schedule
The following table lists official events during the 2008 season.

Order of Merit
The Order of Merit was based on prize money won during the season, calculated using a points-based system.

See also
2008 Danish Golf Tour
2008 Finnish Tour
2008 Swedish Golf Tour (women)

Notes

References

Swedish Golf Tour
Swedish Golf Tour